Big Brother Mzansi: Secrets (also known as Big Brother Mzansi 1 or Big Brother South Africa 3) was the first season of the South African Big Brother reality television series reboot produced by Endemol for M-Net. It began on 2 February 2014 with a new host, Lungile Radu. The season was sponsored by South African liquor brand, Shap Shap Ciders.

Housemates

Iris 
She entered the Chamber on Day 1. She was up for eviction in Week 1 where the housemates in Main House would vote for the chambermate of their choice to enter the Main House she only received 2 votes. In Week 2, she was up for public vote to move to the Main House according to the popularity vote she was in second place but due to the expulsion of Mbali who was the frontrunner Iris moved in the Main House with 25% of public vote. In Week 4 after the boys failed the Secrets Task they were all up for eviction, HoH Jase saved himself and replaced himself with Iris. She then survived public vote after she received 38% of votes to save. She then faced eviction in Week 7 when she was one of the 5 housemates who were conspiring against Lexi which is against the rules. She survived public vote after receiving 11% of votes to save. In Week 8 she was nominated by her fellow housemates for eviction she survived after garnering 29% of votes to save. In the Final Week 9 she came in 2nd place after receiving 20.24% votes to win.

Jase 
He entered the Main House on Day 1. In Week 4 he faced eviction after losing the Secrets task with all the boys but he saved himself as HoH and replaced himself with Iris. In Week 5 he faced eviction after his fellow housemates  nominated him and he survived eviction after receiving 22% of votes to save. In Week 6 he faced eviction again in a row after nominations were tallied he was evicted on Day 42 after only receiving 25% of votes to save.

Jenayne 
She entered the Chamber on Day 1. In Week 1 the housemates in the Main House would decide which Chambermate would join then, she only received 2 votes out of 12. In Week 2 she faced public vote to move to Main House but ultimately she evicted on Day 14 with 16% of the public vote to move.
er

Kat 
She entered the Main House on Day 1. In Week 3 she faced public vote after the girls failed their task, she survived after getting 26% of votes to save. In Week 5 she was nominated for possible eviction and she survived after getting 61% of the votes to save. In Week 7 she was faced public vote after she was one of the 5 housemates caught conspiring against Lexi, she survived eviction after getting 11% of votes to save. In Final Week 9 she voluntarily left the house on the finale Day 63 a receiving money more than R100.000 if she had not opted to leave she would've came in 3rd place as she had received 11.11% of the votes to win.

Kgosi 
He entered the Chamber on Day 1. In Week 1 he receiving the most votes from the housemates in the Main House 7 out of 12, he then moved into the Main House. In Wee 4 he faced eviction after the boys failed the Secrets Task. He was evicted on Day 28 after receiving on 8.6% of public vote to save.

Lexi 
She entered the Main House on Day 1. In Week 3 she faced public vote after the girls failed the Secrets task she survived eviction after receiving 17% of votes to save. In Week 6 she faced eviction after nominations were tallied she survived eviction after receiving 45% of votes to save. In Week 7 after all housemates faced eviction she received 26% of votes to save. In Week 8 she faced eviction after the nominations were tallied she was evicted on Day 56 after only receiving 27% of votes to save.

Lola 
She entered the Main House on Day 1. In Week 5 she was nominated for eviction and was evicted with 6% of votes to save.

Mandla 
He entered the Main House on Day 1. In Week 7 he faced eviction after all housemates were up for eviction due to conspiracy, he survived after receiving 21% of the public vote. In Week 8 he was nominated for eviction by his fellow housemates and he survived after receiving 38% of votes to save. In Final Week 9 he became the winner of Big Brother Mzansi 2014 after receiving 55% of votes to win.

Mbali 
He entered the Chamber on Day 1. In Week 1 he faced possible move to the Main House but he couldn't garner any votes for the housemates in the Main House. In Week 2 he faced public vote to move to the Main House he received the highest vote to move 35% but he was ejected on Day 13 for slapping Iris.

MK 
He entered the Main House on Day 1. In Week 3 all girls except Lola and Iris faced eviction, HOH Mzamo saved Thando and replaced him with MK. He then survived public vote of receiving 28% of votes from the public. In Week 4 he faced eviction as all the boys failed the Secrets task he survived 16% of votes to save. In Week 7 all housemates were nominated for possible eviction after the conspiracy rule was broken. He survived eviction after getting 7% of public vote. In Final Week 9 he came in 4th place after only getting 4.14% to win.

Mzamo 
He entered the Main House on Day 1. In Week 4 he was nominated for eviction after all the boys failed the Secrets Task, he survived the public vote after receiving 13% of votes to save. In Week 7 he was one of the 5 housemates who conspired against Lexi and for that reason all housemates faced public vote. He was evicted on Day 49 after getting 3.5% of votes to save.

Nku 
She entered the Chamber on Day 1. In Week 1 she received only 1 vote from the housemates in the Main House to move. In Week 2 she faced public vote to move to the Main House but she was evicted on Day 14 after getting 12% of votes to move.

Paris 
He entered the Chamber on Day 1. In Week 1 he received only 0 votes out of 12 from the housemates in the Main House to move. In Week 2 he faced public vote to move to the Main House and he was evicted on Day 14 after getting 12% of votes to move.

Poolie 
He entered the Main House on Day 1. In Week 4 he faced public vote after all the boys failed the Secrets Task, he survived eviction after getting 15% of votes to save. In Week 7 as all housemates were nominated for eviction due to the breaking of the conspiracy rule. He survived public vote after getting 5% of votes to save. In Week 8 he was nominated for eviction but he was evicted after getting 6% of votes to save.

Sol 
He entered the Main House on Day 1. In Week 4 he faced eviction after all boys failed the Secrets Task, he survived after getting 9% of votes to save. In Week 6 he faced public vote and he survived after receiving 30% of votes to save. In Week 7 as all housemates faced public vote he survived eviction after getting 6% of votes to save. In Final Week 9 he came in 5th place after getting 1.43% of votes to save.

Thando 
She entered the Main House on Day 1. In Week 3 as the girls failed Secrets Task she faced eviction but HOH Mzamo saved her from public vote. In Week 5 HOH Sol saved Mandla and replaced him with Thando, she then survived public vote after getting 11% of votes to save. In Week 7 she was one of the 5 housemates who were caught breaking the no-conspiracy rule so all housemates faced public vote she was evicted on Day 49 after getting 4.5% of votes to save.

Vanessa 
She entered the Main House on Day 1. In Week 3 she faced public vote as all the girls failed the Secrets Task she was then evicted on Day 21 after only getting 10% of votes to save.

Twists

The Chamber 
On Day 1, six housemates Jenayne, Paris, Nku, Kgosi, Mbali and Iris (named Chambermates) entered in The Chamber.

On Day 5, housemates currently on the Main House voted for who between the Chambermates they want to see in the Main House. The votes were later revealed at Day 7, during the live show. It was revealed that Kgosi was chosen by the housemates to enter the Main House, with 7 votes.

The public voted for who should also enter in the Main House, with the other 4 being evicted from the House. After Mbali was ejected, Iris, who got the most votes after Mbali, moved to the Main House, while Jenayne, Nku and Paris were evicted.

Secrets 
Like in the Big Brother Australia 2012, females were called to the Parlour Room and had to correctly guess the all males' secrets.

As they failed to guess the males' secrets, the males are all immune for nominations in Week 3. On the next week, it the same twist happened, but this time it was the males that had to guess females' secrets. As they guessed wrong, all females won immunity.

Immunity challenges 
After the girls guessing wrongly male's secrets, all males won immunity. On Day 15, after winning a challenge, Jase and Lola won immunity from the nominations. After that, all girls were put up for eviction, with exception of Iris (who was new in the House) and Lola (who won immunity). However, HoH Mzamo could save one of the girls, and replace her with a male. He chose to save Thando, and nominate MK in her place.

On Week 4, it happened the same, but with an exception. After the boys guessing wrongly female's secrets, all females won immunity. On Day 22, after winning a challenge, Kat and Mandla won immunity from the nominations. After that, all boys were put up for eviction, with exception of Mandla (who won immunity). However, HoH Jase could save one of the boys, and replace him with a female. He chose to save himself, and nominate Iris in his place.

On Week 5, after the housemates nominated, it was held an immunity challenge. Mzamo and Lexi won it, and are the only saved housemates for the nominations. Sol, as HoH, decided to sace Mandla and put Thando in his place.

On Week 6, Loko and Mandla won the immunity challenge after the nominations were held. Mzamo as HoH, saved Thando and nominated Sol in her place.

On Week 7, due to the Housemates breaking the no conspiracy rule, Big Brother decided to put up all Housemates for eviction.

On Week 8, Kat and Sol won the immunity challenge after the nominations were held. Because most Housemates are up for eviction, no Save and Replace session was held.

Guest Housemate
On week 7, Emmett Blois, an ex-housemate from Big Brother Canada, entered the Big Brother Mzansi House with orders from Big Brother to "shake things up in the house". In an attempt to split-up the relationships, Emmett requested Big Brother to go on a date with the remaining female Housemates - Kat, Iris, Lexi and Loko - to which Big Brother approved. He also tried manipulating the male Housemates into thinking that the female Housemates were playing a game on them, however he was overheard by Loko. He also took part in that week's Task Presentation where Housemates had to dramatise a scene whereby the tour guides (Mandla and MK) showed the rest of the Housemates through Beautiful Mzansi. Blois also formed a close friendship with fellow-Housemate, MK. Emmett left the House the following Sunday and was interviewed by host, Lungile Radu. Viewers of Big Brother Mzansi nicknamed Blois, "White Chocolate."

Nomination History

Nominations: Results

References

External links 
 

South Africa
2014 South African television seasons